In psychoanalytic literature, a Madonna–whore complex, also called a Madonna–mistress complex, is the inability to maintain sexual arousal within a committed, loving relationship. First identified by Sigmund Freud, under the rubric of psychic impotence, this psychological complex is said to develop in men who see women as either saintly Madonnas or debased prostitutes. Men with this behavioral complex desire a sexual partner who has been degraded (the whore) while they cannot desire the respected partner (the Madonna). Freud wrote: "Where such men love they have no desire and where they desire they cannot love." Clinical psychologist Uwe Hartmann, writing in 2009, stated that the complex "is still highly prevalent in today's patients".

Causes
Freud argued that the Madonna–whore complex was caused by a split between the affectionate and the sexual currents in male desire. Oedipal and castration anxiety fears prohibit the affection felt for past incestuous objects from being attached to women who are sensually desired: "The whole sphere of love in such persons remains divided in the two directions personified in art as sacred and profane (or animal) love".  In order to minimize anxiety, the man categorizes women into two groups: women he can admire and women he finds sexually attractive. Whereas the man loves women in the former category, he despises and devalues the latter group. Psychoanalyst Richard Tuch suggests that Freud offered at least one alternative explanation for the Madonna–whore complex: This earlier theory is based not on oedipal-based castration anxiety but on man's primary hatred of women, stimulated by the child's sense that he had been made to experience intolerable frustration and/or narcissistic injury at the hands of his mother. According to this theory, in adulthood the boy-turned-man seeks to avenge these mistreatments through sadistic attacks on women who are stand-ins for mother.

It is possible that such a split may be exacerbated when the sufferer is raised by a cold but overprotective mother – a lack of emotional nurturing paradoxically strengthening an incestuous tie. Such a man will often court someone with maternal qualities, hoping to fulfill a need for maternal intimacy unmet in childhood, only for a return of the repressed feelings surrounding the earlier relationship to prevent sexual satisfaction in the new.

Another theory claims that the Madonna–whore complex derives from the alleged representations of women as either madonnas or whores in mythology and Christian theology rather than developmental disabilities of individual men.

History

Titian's Sacred and Profane Love (1514; the sacred-profane title is from 1693) has several interpretations. The clothed woman has said to be dressed as a bride and as a courtesan. The nude woman seems at first sight to be an allegory of profane love, but 20th-century assessments notice the incense on her hand and the church beyond her.
James Joyce widely utilized the Madonna–whore polarity in his novel A Portrait of the Artist as a Young Man. His protagonist, Stephen Daedalus, sees girls who he admires as ivory towers, and the repression of his sexual feelings for them eventually leads him to solicit a prostitute. This mortal sin drives Stephen's inner conflict and eventual transformation towards the end of the novel.

Alfred Hitchcock used the Madonna–whore dichotomy as an important mode of representing women. In Vertigo (1958), for example, Kim Novak portrays two women that the hero cannot reconcile: a virtuous, blonde, sophisticated, sexually repressed "madonna" and a dark-haired, single, sensual "fallen woman".

The Martin Scorsese films Taxi Driver and Raging Bull feature sexually obsessed protagonists, both played by Robert De Niro, who exhibit the Madonna–whore complex with the women they interact with.
The singer Madonna played with both identities, especially in her earlier career. Madonna herself declared: "I have always loved to play cat and mouse with the conventional stereotypes. My Like a Virgin album cover is a classic example. People were thinking who was I pretending to be—the Virgin Mary or the whore? These were the two extreme images of women I had known vividly, and remembered from childhood, and I wanted to play with them. I wanted to see if I can merge them together, Virgin Mary and the whore as one and all. The photo was a statement of independence, if you wanna be a virgin, you are welcome. But if you wanna be a whore, it's your fucking right to be so."

See also

 Ambivalence 
 Coolidge effect
 Dichotomy
 Female Chauvinist Pigs
 Friend zone
 Gender norms in abstinence-only sex education
 Love and hate (psychoanalysis)
 Love–hate relationship
 Machismo
 Marianismo
 Misogyny
 Ni Putes Ni Soumises
 Neo-Freudianism
 Sexism
 Splitting (psychology)

References

Further reading
 

Dichotomies
Complex (psychology)
Cognitive dissonance
Object relations theory
Psychoanalytic terminology
Freudian psychology
Problem behavior
Violence against women
Psychological abuse
Misogyny
Stereotypes of women